The Silver Support Scheme Act 2015 is a statute of the Parliament of Singapore that implements the social security Silver Support Scheme in Singapore. The law supplements the retirement savings of the needy elderly, to help them cope with their living expenses.

Overview
The Silver Support Scheme Act of 2015 is a law detailing the framework and penalties for the Silver Support Scheme. It caters for around 150,000 eligible Singaporeans who are at least 65 years of age to receive a quarterly government payout of between S$300 and S$750 from beginning 2016 onwards. The scheme in general is maintained by the Central Provident Fund Board of the Government of Singapore, which assesses a person's eligibility and thereby paying him or her. Qualifying factors may include lifetime wages, household support and housing type.

Singaporeans may opt out from this process. In contrast with the Pioneer Generation Programme which focuses solely on Singaporean pioneers that are Singaporean residents during national independence, the Silver Support Scheme looks after both current and future generations of elderly.

Uses of the Act

The Silver Support Scheme was introduced in August 2014 during the National Day Rally by Prime Minister Lee Hsien Loong. The overall aim is mitigating inequalities by supplementing incomes for the bottom 20-30% of elderly Singaporeans, who may have lesser means, in their retirement years.

In the case of those with private housing addresses but may require similar help, they may not automatically qualify for the scheme being 'marginal cases', however they may appeal to the Commissioner on a case-by-base basis.

See also
 Ministry of Manpower (Singapore)

References

External links
 Silver Support Scheme Act 2015

2015 in law
2015 in Singapore
Singaporean legislation